Vecon is the brand of a concentrated vegetable stock, used for flavouring dishes.  It is popular amongst vegetarians, as it can be used to replace other stock in soups, stews, etc.
It is fortified with a number of vitamins that are rarer in vegetarian or vegan diets, including iron and vitamin B12.

It is also used, sparingly, as a spread much like Marmite is on toast.

Ingredients
Hydrolysed vegetable (soya and maize), protein, water, dehydrated vegetable powder (onion, celery, tomato, parsley, spinach, garlic) yeast extract, red pepper extract 1%, carrot extract 1%, kelp, ferrous sulphate, vitamin C, niacin, beta carotene ground black pepper, riboflavin, thiamin, vitamin B12.

Nutritional information
Per 100g: 
Energy 531kJ/125kcal, Protein 16.6g, Carbohydrate 13.9g as sugars 2.9g, Fat 1.3g, as saturates 0.0g, Fibre 3.4g, Sodium 16.5g, Vitamin A 833.00 ug, Vitamin C 100.00 mg, Thiamin (Vit B) 5.00 mg, Riboflavin (Vit B2) 6.00 mg, Niacin 50.00 mg, Vitamin B12 13.00 ug, Iron 70.00 mg

Distribution
Australia - Kintra Foods

References

Vegetarian cuisine
Food ingredients